Cottingham may refer to:

Places
Cottingham, East Riding of Yorkshire, England
Cottingham railway station, a railroad station in Cottingham
Cottingham High School, a secondary school in Cottingham
Cottingham, Northamptonshire, England

Buildings 
Cottingham Castle (disambiguation), two castles in Cottingham, East Riding of Yorkshire, England
Cottingham House, a house built in 1907 in Louisiana, USA

Other
Cottingham Phoenix, an English rugby team 
Cottingham Springboard Festival, an annual grassroots music festival in Cottingham, East Riding of Yorkshire

People with the surname
Bob Cottingham (born 1966), American Olympic fencer
Cicely Cottingham, American artist
Edward B. Cottingham (born 1928), American politician
Henry Cottingham (17th century), Anglican priest
John Cottingham (born 1943), British philosopher
Kathryn L. Cottingham, American ecologist and environmentalist
Laura Cottingham (born 1959), American art critic, curator and visual artist
Lewis Nockalls Cottingham (1787–1847), British architect
Mike Cottingham (fl. 1930), Irish folklorist
Richard Cottingham (born 1946), American serial killer
Robert Cottingham (born 1935), American photorealist painter
Thomas de Cottingham (c. 1300–1370), English cleric and judge
William McOuat Cottingham (1905–1983), Canadian politician